Anja Mittag (born 16 May 1985) is a German football coach and player who plays as a striker. Mittag is currently a player-coach for RB Leipzig.

In July 2020, Mittag announced that she will end her playing career after the women's Saxony Cup final on 30 August 2020 and become a full-time coach with RB Leipzig. She made her comeback in the winter season 2021/22 SV Eintrach Leipzig-Süd in the german Regionalliga Nordost. She will sporadically take part in the games

Club career
In December 2011 Mittag negotiated a release from 1. FFC Turbine Potsdam, after nine and a half years, in order to sign a two-year deal with Swedish Damallsvenskan club FC Rosengård. In May 2015, she signed a two-year deal with French club Paris Saint-Germain. On 30 August 2016, Mittag joined German club VfL Wolfsburg on a two-year deal. On 31 March 2017, Mittag signed a contract with Rosengård once again.

Mittag became the first player to 50 goals in the UEFA Women's Champions League and its predecessor the UEFA Women's Cup on 11 October 2017.

Mittag ended her playing career after the women's Saxony Cup final on 30 August 2020.

International career

She was part of the squad for the 2016 Summer Olympics, where Germany won the gold medal.

On 22 August 2017, she announced her retirement from international football.

Coaching career
In June 2019, Mittag joined third-tier German club RB Leipzig as a player-coach. After scoring 17 goals and helping the team win promotion to the 2. Frauen-Bundesliga, Mittag announced that she would focus on coaching full-time from the 2020–21 season onward.

Career statistics
Scores and results list Germany's goal tally first, score column indicates score after each Mittag goal.

Honours
1. FFC Turbine Potsdam
Bundesliga: 2003–04, 2005–06, 2008–09, 2009–10, 2010–11
DFB-Pokal: 2003–04, 2004–05, 2005–06
UEFA Women's Champions League: 2004–05, 2009–10
DFB-Hallenpokal for women: 2004, 2005, 2008, 2009, 2010

FC Rosengård
Damallsvenskan: 2013, 2014
Svenska Supercupen: 2012, 2015

Germany
FIFA Women's World Cup: 2007
UEFA Women's Championship: 2005, 2009, 2013
Football at the Summer Olympics: Bronze medal 2008, Gold medal 2016
Algarve Cup: 2006, 2012, 2014

Germany U20
FIFA U-20 Women's World Cup: 2004

Germany U19
UEFA Women's Under-19 Championship: 2002

Individual
Sweden's Player of the Year 2012, 2014
Damallsvenskan top scorers: 2012, 2014, 2018
FIFA Women's World Cup Bronze Boot: 2015
FIFA Women's World Cup All Star Team: 2015
FIFA Women's World Cup Dream Team: 2015
UEFA Women's Champions League All-Time Top Scorer
FIFA U-20 Women's World Cup Bronze Ball: 2004
FIFA U-20 Women's World Cup Silver Shoe: 2004
Fritz Walter Medal: Gold 2005
UEFA Women's Under-19 Championship: Golden Player 2004
FIFPro: FIFA FIFPro World XI 2015
Silbernes Lorbeerblatt: 2007, 2016

Records
2nd all-time UEFA women's club competition top scorer: 51 goals

Others
Together with her former teammate Josephine Henning she runs the podcast Mittag’s bei Henning.

References

External links
 

1985 births
Living people
Sportspeople from Chemnitz
German women's footballers
Germany women's international footballers
2007 FIFA Women's World Cup players
2015 FIFA Women's World Cup players
Women's association football forwards
1. FFC Turbine Potsdam players
Footballers at the 2008 Summer Olympics
Footballers at the 2016 Summer Olympics
Olympic gold medalists for Germany
Olympic bronze medalists for Germany
Olympic medalists in football
FC Rosengård players
Damallsvenskan players
Medalists at the 2008 Summer Olympics
Medalists at the 2016 Summer Olympics
FIFA Women's World Cup-winning players
FIFA Century Club
QBIK players
Expatriate women's footballers in Sweden
Paris Saint-Germain Féminine players
Expatriate women's footballers in France
German expatriate women's footballers
German expatriate sportspeople in Sweden
German expatriate sportspeople in France
VfL Wolfsburg (women) players
Frauen-Bundesliga players
Division 1 Féminine players
Olympic footballers of Germany
UEFA Women's Championship-winning players
Footballers from Saxony
UEFA Women's Euro 2017 players